Miguel Sevillano (16 October 1928 – 3 November 1998) was an Argentine cyclist. He competed in the individual and team road race events at the 1948 Summer Olympics.

References

External links
 

1928 births
1998 deaths
Argentine male cyclists
Olympic cyclists of Argentina
Cyclists at the 1948 Summer Olympics
Cyclists from Buenos Aires